"L'Envie" is a song written by Jean-Jacques Goldman and originally recorded by French singer Johnny Hallyday on his 1987 album Gang.

In 1988 a live version of the song recorded at Palais de Bercy in 1987 was released as a single from Hallyday's 1988 live album Johnny à Bercy.

Composition and writing 
The song was written by Jean-Jacques Goldman.

Charts

"L'Envie" (en concert à Bercy)

"L'Envie"

References 

1987 songs
1988 singles
Johnny Hallyday songs
Philips Records singles
Songs written by Jean-Jacques Goldman
Song recordings produced by Michel Berger